Keith Butler may refer to:

Sports
Keith Butler (American football) (born 1956), current NFL assistant
Keith Butler (baseball) (born 1989), American baseball player
Keith Butler (basketball) (born 1983), basketball player formerly in the NBA D-League, see 2008 NBA Development League Draft
Keith Butler (English cricketer) (born 1971), former English cricketer
Keith Butler (New Zealand cricketer) (born 1933), New Zealand cricketer
Keith Butler (cyclist) (born 1938), former British cycling champion

Others
Keith Butler (Michigan politician), American pastor and Republican politician from Michigan
Keith Butler (author) (born 1948), Indian Australian writer
Keith Butler (Ontario politician) (1920–1977), Canadian politician